Paul Endacott (July 3, 1902 – January 8, 1997) was a collegiate basketball player in the 1920s. The Lawrence, Kansas native attended the University of Kansas from 1919 to 1923. Playing under Hall of Fame coach Phog Allen, Endacott led the 1921–1922 Jayhawks and the 1922–1923 Jayhawks to consecutive Helms Athletic Foundation national championships. In 1936, the Helms Foundation retroactively named him to the 1922 and 1923 All-American teams.  He was also named the Helms Foundation Player of the Year for 1923. His No. 12 jersey is retired by the University of Kansas.

Following his collegiate career, he spent four years with the AAU Phillips Petroleum Company Team, from 1924 to 1928. He went on to serve as President of Phillips Petroleum in his later years. Endacott was inducted into the Naismith Memorial Basketball Hall of Fame as a player in 1972.

External links
Basketball Hall of Fame page on Endacott
KU Endacott Society history http://www.kuonlinedirectory.org/endacott/?page_id=63
https://www.hoopszone.net/Kansas/Kansas/Players/E/endacott-paul.htm

1902 births
1997 deaths
All-American college men's basketball players
American men's basketball players
Basketball players from Kansas
Guards (basketball)
Kansas Jayhawks men's basketball players
Phillips 66ers players
Naismith Memorial Basketball Hall of Fame inductees
National Collegiate Basketball Hall of Fame inductees
Sportspeople from Lawrence, Kansas